The 2014–15 All-Ireland Junior Club Football Championship was the 14th staging of the All-Ireland Junior Club Football Championship since its establishment by the Gaelic Athletic Association.

The All-Ireland final was played on 14 February 2015 at Croke Park in Dublin, between Brosna and John Mitchels. Brosna won the match by 0-08 to 0-05 to claim their first ever championship title.

All-Ireland Junior Club Football Championship

All-Ireland final

References

2014 in Irish sport
2015 in Irish sport
All-Ireland Junior Club Football Championship
All-Ireland Junior Club Football Championship